Dalton Vigh de Sousa Vales (born July 10, 1964) is a Brazilian actor.

Biography 

At three years Dalton moved to Santos, and in 1986 moved to São Paulo.

Graduated in Advertising in the Methodist University of São Paulo, did not follow his career. He also studied drama at school Célia Helena.

Career 
Dalton's first job in television soap opera was the Tocaia Grande, 1995. He starred with Patrícia de Sabrit novels the Pérola Negra of SBT and Vidas Cruzadas of Rede Record.

Dalton gained notoriety when introducing the Top TV program in 2000. It was also host of the cable television channel People & Arts. But the greatest public recognition came with his interpretation of Said Rachid in the soap opera O Clone, 2001. Interpreted the historical character Luigi Rossetti in the miniseries A Casa das Sete Mulheres (2003).

After some work with fewer repercussions, Dalton returned to shine as the Clovis Moura villain in the soap opera O Profeta, 2006. The Prophet success earned him an invitation to star in the soap opera Duas Caras, 2007, written by Aguinaldo Silva, playing the villain (redeemed throughout history) Marconi Ferraço.

His film debut was in behind the scenes of 1999. In the theater, has acted in several plays, mainly comedies.

In 2009, the cast of the show Cinquentinha, in 2010 participated in the series S.O.S. Emergência, Na Forma da Lei and As Cariocas.

In 2011 was in series Lara com Z, and joined the cast of soap opera Fina Estampa of Rede Globo, as Renê Velmont, one of the protagonists.

In 2012, is the soap opera Salve Jorge of Glória Perez, interpreting the lawyer Carlos Flores Galvão. In 2015, he plays doctor Tomás in I Love Paraisópolis.

In 2016, he appeared in the telenovela Liberdade, Liberdade. In 2017, he did not renew his contract with Rede Globo and revealed plans to be a screenwriter and director, his desire to take a break in soap operas, and participation in HBO's series O Negócio.

Personal life 
Dalton maintained relationships with actress Micaela Góes (2000–2002), sister of actress Georgiana Góes, and the actress Bárbara Paz (2003–2005).

In 2011, he was engaged to actress Camila Czerkes, with whom he married later,  and had twin children, Arthur and David.

Filmography

Television

Films

Theater

Nominations 
 2007: Contigo Award, for best supporting actor by the soap opera O Profeta.
 2008: Contigo Award for best actor by the soap opera Duas Caras.
 2008: Contigo Award best romantic couple by the soap opera Duas Caras.
 2010: Arte Qualidade Brasil Award for best supporting actor by the serie Cinquentinha.
 2012: Contigo Award for best supporting actor by the serie Lara com Z.
 2012: Contigo Award for best actor by the soap opera Fina Estampa.

References

External links 
 

1964 births
Living people
Male actors from Rio de Janeiro (city)
Brazilian people of Hungarian descent
Brazilian male television actors
Brazilian male telenovela actors
Brazilian male film actors
Brazilian male stage actors
Methodist University of São Paulo alumni
20th-century Brazilian male actors
21st-century Brazilian male actors